Abdol-Hamid Heyrat Sajjadi (in Persian: سید عبدالحمید حیرت سجادی) is a notable Iranian scholar, researcher, literary figure and historian.

He studied Persian literature and history and got a PhD degree in theology from Tehran University. He is known for his works on Iranian culture. His historical photo collection from Kurdistan is one of the biggest photo collection of this kind in Iran. 
 
His father, Mohammad Baqer Heyrat Sajjadi, was the founder of first modern schools in Kurdistan.

Books
History of Modern Education in Kurdistan (two volumes in Persian)

Awards
Distinguished contributor to Iranian culture, by Iranian Cultural Heritage Organization (2004)

External links
An event in honor of Abdol-Hamid Heyrat Sajjadi (in Persian)

Iranian writers
Year of birth missing (living people)
University of Tehran alumni
Iranian Iranologists
People from Sanandaj
Living people
Kurdish scholars
Kurdish historians